Alfred Sione Pupunu (born October 16, 1969) is a former professional American football tight end who played nine seasons in the National Football League from 1992 to 2000.

High school career
Pupunu attended and played high school football at South High School in Salt Lake City, Utah.

College career
Pupunu played college football at Weber State University, where he went on to earn all-Big Sky Conference and All-American honors and has been inducted into the school’s athletic Hall of Fame. Pupunu earned Walter Camp All-American honors after leading the nation (NCAA Division I-AA, now Football Championship Subdivision) in receptions, with 93, in 1991. The 93 receptions are the second-most ever in a single season by a tight end.

Pupunu was also an All-Conference performer at Dixie State College of Utah.

Professional career

Playing career
Pupunu played for the San Diego Chargers (1992–1997, 1999), the Kansas City Chiefs (1997), the New York Giants (1998) and the Detroit Lions (2000). Pupunu made a championship appearance with the Chargers in Super Bowl XXIX in the 1994 season, and helped them get there by scoring a touchdown in the AFC title game.

Though Pupunu only scored five career touchdowns (three regular season, two postseason), he performed a unique celebration after each, in which he mimicked twisting off the top of a coconut and drinking the juice, a very popular celebration among San Diego fans.

Pupunu finished his career with 102 receptions for 1,000 yards and three touchdowns in 103 games.

Coaching career
Pupunu was a volunteer assistant at the University of Utah Utes Football Team for three years (2005–2007).

In 2008, Pupunu was invited to coach the running backs and tight ends at the Southern Utah University (Cedar City, UT) Thunderbirds Football Team by Head Coach Ed Lamb. On February 24, 2010, Pupunu was named assistant coach at the University of Idaho. Pupunu then starting coaching the tight ends at Weber State University beginning in the 2017 season. 

In January 2019, he joined the University of Colorado staff as the tight end coach, hired by new CU head coach Mel Tucker.

Personal life
Pupunu was born in Tonga, but moved to Utah with his parents as a baby.

In June 2014 Pupunu was arrested and charged with battery after an incident at his home. The charge was later dropped.

Notes and references

External links
Southern Utah Coach Bio
Weber State Coach Bio

1969 births
Tongan emigrants to the United States
American football tight ends
Detroit Lions players
Utah Tech Trailblazers football players
Kansas City Chiefs players
Living people
New York Giants players
San Diego Chargers players
Tongan players of American football
Weber State Wildcats football players